Jennifer Lee Spiehs (born January 25, 1978) is a retired American soccer midfielder/defender who was a member of the United States women's national soccer team.

International career statistics

References

External links
 W-League player profile
 WUSA player profile
 WUSA Festival player profile
 Nebraska Cornhuskers player profile

1978 births
Living people
USL W-League (1995–2015) players
American women's soccer players
United States women's international soccer players
Philadelphia Charge players
Nebraska Cornhuskers women's soccer players
Women's United Soccer Association players
Women's association football midfielders
Women's association football defenders
FC Energy Voronezh players
American expatriate sportspeople in Russia
Expatriate women's footballers in Russia
American expatriate women's soccer players
New Jersey Wildcats players
Denver Diamonds players